Alloneuron ecuadorense is a species of plant in the family Melastomataceae. It is endemic to Ecuador.  Its natural habitat is subtropical or tropical moist montane forests.

References

ecuadorense
Endemic flora of Ecuador
Vulnerable plants
Taxonomy articles created by Polbot
Plants described in 1981